The 2019–20 Women's Volleyball Thailand League is the 15th season of the Women's Volleyball Thailand League, the top Thai professional league for women's volleyball clubs, since its establishment in 2005, also known as CP Women's Volleyball Thailand League due to the sponsorship deal with Charoen Pokphand. A total of 8 teams will compete in the league. The season will begin on 18 January 2020 and concluded on 30 July 2019. This season will be organized by the Thailand Volleyball Association (TVA) instead Thailand Volleyball Co.,Ltd. The season started.

Teams
Eight teams compete in the league – the top six teams from the previous season and the two teams promoted from the Pro Challenge. The promoted teams are Diamond Food and Rangsit University. Rangsit University retains its position after relegation in previous season, while Diamond Food reaches a top division for the first time. Diamond Food replaced King Bangkok (relegated after four years in the top division).

Qualified teams
League positions of the previous season shown in parentheses (TH: Thailand League title holders; SL: Supur League title holders).
<div style="width:850px;">

</div style="width:850px;">

Personnel and kits

Squads

National team players
Players name in bold indicates the player is registered during the mid-season transfer window.

Foreign players
Players name in bold indicates the player is registered during the mid-season transfer window.

Schedule

Format
Regular seasons
First leg (Week 1–5): single round-robin; The eighth place will relegate to Pro League.
Second leg: (Week 6–9) single round-robin; The top four will advance to Final series and the seventh place will relegate to Pro League.
Final series
First leg (Week 10): single round-robin.
Second leg: (Week 11) single round-robin.

Standing procedure 
 Number of matches won
 Match points
 Sets ratio
 Points ratio
 Result of the last match between the tied teams

Match won 3–0 or 3–1: 3 match points for the winner, 0 match points for the loser
Match won 3–2: 2 match points for the winner, 1 match point for the loser

Regular seasons – First leg

First leg table

Week 1
Venue: MCC Hall The Mall Bangkapi, Bangkok 
Dates: 18–22 January 2020

|}

Week 2
Venue: MCC Hall The Mall Bangkapi, Bangkok 
Dates: 25–29 January 2020

|}

Week 3
Venue: MCC Hall The Mall Korat, Nakhon Ratchasima 
Dates: 1–5 February 2020

|}

Week 4
Venue: MCC Hall The Mall Korat, Nakhon Ratchasima 
Dates: 8–12 February 2020

|}

Week 5
Venue: Eastern National Sports Training Center, Pattaya 
Dates: 15–16 February 2020

|}

Regular seasons – Second leg

Second leg table

Week 6
Venue: MCC Hall The Mall Bangkapi, Bangkok 
Dates: 22–26 February 2020

|}

Week 7
Venue: MCC Hall The Mall Bangkapi, Bangkok 
Dates: 29 February–4 March 2020

|}

Week 8
Venue: MCC Hall The Mall Bangkapi, Bangkok 
Dates: 7–11 March 2020

|}

Week 9
Venue: MCC Hall The Mall Korat, Nakhon Ratchasima 
Dates: 14–15 March 2020

|}

Final series

Final series table

Week 10

Final Series Week 1
Venue: MCC Hall The Mall Bangkapi, Bangkok  
Dates: 18–22 March 2020

|}

Week 11

Final Series Week 2
Venue: MCC Hall The Mall Bangkapi, Bangkok 
Dates: 28–30 March 2020

|}

Final standing

Awards

Most Valuable Player
  Ajcharaporn Kongyot (Generali Supreme Chonburi)
Best Best Scorer
  Chatchu-on Moksri (Nakhon Ratchasima The Mall)
Best Outside Spiker
  Sutadta Chuewulim (Generali Supreme Chonburi)
  Chatchu-on Moksri (Nakhon Ratchasima The Mall)
Best Servers
  Soraya Phomla (Generali Supreme Chonburi)

Best Middle Blocker
  Thatdao Nuekjang (Khonkaen Star)
  Pleumjit Thinkaow (Generali Supreme Chonburi)
Best Setter
  Pornpun Guedpard (Khonkaen Star)
Best Opposite Spiker
  Pimpichaya Kokram (3BB Nakornnont)
Best Libero
  Tikamporn Changkeaw (Khonkaen Star)

References

External links 

 
 

2019
Thailand League